Oskar Nedbal (26 March 1874 – 24 December 1930) was a Czech violist, composer, and conductor of classical music.

Early life
Nedbal was born in Tábor, in southern Bohemia. He studied the violin at the Prague Conservatory under Antonín Bennewitz.

Career
He was principal conductor with the Czech Philharmonic Orchestra from 1896 to 1906 and was a founder member of the Bohemian String Quartet, as violist.

A great admirer of his teacher Antonín Dvořák, Nedbal also paid homage to other composers. For example, in his 1910 composition, Romantic Piece, Op. 18 for cello and piano, Nedbal cleverly inserts a theme usually associated with Mozart, Ah, vous dirai-je, Maman.

His works include one (unsuccessful) opera, Jakob the Peasant (1919–1920), and the operettas Chaste Barbara (1910), Polish Blood (1913), The Vineyard Bride (1916), and Beautiful Saskia (1917).

in 1926 he conducted the premiere of Jan Levoslav Bella's opera, Wieland der Schmied in Bratislava.

Death and legacy
Because of mounting personal debts, Nedbal committed suicide by jumping out of a window of the Zagreb Opera House on 24 December 1930.

In recent years, Nedbal's haunting Valse Triste featured in his ballet Der Faule Hans (The Tale of Simple Johnny) has been a favorite stand-alone encore piece of the Czech Philharmonic Orchestra. The waltz is also played on the piano at a key moment by one of the characters in Heimito von Doderer's novel of the inter-war years in Vienna, The Demons (Die Dämonen) (1956).

Selected works
Opera
 Sedlák Jakub (Jakub the Peasant; Le paysan Jakob) (1919–1920, revised 1928); libretto by L. Novák after Lope de Vega; premiere performance 13 October 1922 in Brno

Operettas
 Cudná Barbora (Chaste Barbara; Barbara the Chaste; Die keusche Barbara), Operetta in 3 acts (1910); libretto by Rudolf Bernauer,  and V. Stech; premiere performance 14 September 1910, Vinohrady Theatre, Prague
 Polská krev (Polish Blood; Polenblut), Operetta in 3 acts (1913); libretto by Leo Stein; premiere performance 25 October 1913, Carltheater, Vienna
 Mamselle Napoleon, Operetta in 1 act (1918, revised 1928); libretto by Emil Gölz and Arnold Gölz; premiere performance 21 January 1919, Die Hölle, Vienna
 Donna Gloria, Operetta in 3 acts (1925); libretto by Viktor Léon and Heinz Reichert; premiere performance 30 December 1925, Carltheater, Vienna
 Das Dorf ohne Männer, Operetta in 1 act (manuscript)
 Die Erntebraut; revision of Polská krev with a German libretto by Hermann Hermecke; premiere performance 1942, Admiralspalast, Berlin
 Podzimní píseň (Autumn Song; Le Chant d'automne); revision of Vinobraní with Czech libretto by Václav Špilar and Václav Mírovský; premiere performance 24 October 1930, Velká opereta, Prague

Ballets
 Pohádka o Honzovi (The Tale of Honza; Tale of Simple Johnny; Jean le paresseux; Der faule Hans), Ballet-Pantomime in 5 scenes (1901–1902); libretto by František Karel Hejda; premiere performance 24 January 1902, National Theatre, Prague
 Z pohádky do pohádky (From Fairy Tale to Fairy Tale; De conte en conte; Großmütterchens Märchenschätze) (1907); libretto by Ladislav Novák; premiere performance 25 January 1908, National Theatre, Prague
 Princezna Hyacinta (Princess Hyacinth) (1910); libretto by Ladislav Novák; premiere performance 1 September 1911, National Theatre, Prague
 Čertova babička (The Devil's Grandmother; Des Teufels Großmutter), Ballet-Pantomime in 3 scenes (1912); libretto by Karl van Zeska and Gertrude Stöhr; premiere performance 20 April 1912, Wiener Hofoper, Vienna
 Andersen, Fairy Tale Ballet in 7 scenes, a prologue and an epilogue (1912); libretto by Ladislav Novák and Jaroslav Kvapil; premiere performance 1 March 1914, Ronacher, Vienna
 Pevec lásky (Le Minnesänger) (1921); libretto by Ladislav Novák; premiere performance 9 April 1921 in Vienna (manuscript)
 Cikánské kouzlo (La magicien tzigane); libretto by V. Stech (manuscript, incomplete)
 Tajna; libretto by C. Sylva (manuscript, incomplete)

Incidental music
 Die Hermannsschlacht, Music for the play by Heinrich von Kleist (1914); premiere performance 10 December 1914, Burgtheater, Vienna

Orchestral
 Slavnostní pochod (Festival March; Festmarsch), Op. 3 (premiere 1894)
 Scherzo caprice (Scherzo capriccioso) in G major, Op. 5 (1892)
 Suite mignonne; orchestration (1920–1923) of the piano work Aus dem Kinderleben, Op. 15
 Unie (Union), Festival March (1928)
 Česká polka (Czech Polka) for string orchestra

Concertante
 Romance et sérénade for violin and piano (or orchestra), Op. 6 (1893)
 Romance for cello and orchestra

Chamber music
 Romance et sérénade for violin and piano (or orchestra), Op. 6 (1893)
 Sonata in B minor for violin and piano, Op. 9 (published 1896)
 Dvě skladby (2 Pieces) for cello and piano (or orchestra), Op. 12 (1899)
   Romance in F major
   Capriccio in F major
 Valse triste in G minor for string quartet (1907); from the ballet Pohádka o Honzovi
 Romantický kus (Pièce romantique) in D major for cello and piano, Op. 18 (1910)
 Sonata in D major for violin and piano (manuscript)
 Fugue in D major for string quartet
 Prosba for 3 violins
 Romance for clarinet (manuscript)

Piano
 Variace na thema Antonína Dvořáka (Variations of a Theme of Dvořák), Op. 1
 Lettres intimes, 3 Pieces, Op. 7 (1894)
 Čtyři kusy (4 Pièces), Op. 8 (1894)
   Barcarola
   Valse petite
   Impromptu
   Valse caprice
 Silhouette, Op. 10 (1895)
 Humoreska in G major (1896)
 Aus vergangenen Zeiten, Op. 13 (1897); An orchestral version also exists in manuscript form.
 Z dětského života (Aus dem Kinderleben), Suite, Op. 15; orchestrated as Suite mignonne (1920–1923)
 Pohádka o smuku a štěstí (Fairy Tale of Grief and Joy; In Leid und Lust), Op. 16 (1905)
 Valses silhouettes, Op. 17 (1907)
 Sonata in D major (manuscript)
 Humoreske en do majeur sur un thème de Dvořák (manuscript)
 Reisebildchen (manuscript)
 Weihnachtsstimmung (published 1908)
 Preludium

 Vocal
 4 písně (4 Songs) for voice and piano, Op. 2 (published 1896)
   Za svitu luny
   Anděl strážce
   Dívčí popěvek
   Píseň v národním tónu
 4 písně (4 Songs) for voice and piano, Op. 4 (1892)
 4 písně (4 Songs) for voice and piano, Op. 11 (1896); words by Josef Václav Sládek
   Sen
   Oči
   Dudák
   Co na nebi je hvězdiček
 Píseň pro nová srdce (Chant pour les nouveaux cœurs) (manuscript)
 Militär und Volkslieder; words by Karel Dostál-Lutinov and Hornoff (manuscript)

Film scores
 Svatý Václav (Saint Wenceslas) (1929); directed by Jan Stanislav Kolár

References
http://www.johann-strauss.org.uk/composers-n-z.php?id=184

External links

Photographs in Šechtl & Voseček archive
Scores by Oskar Nedbal in digital library Polona

1874 births
1930 suicides
Czech classical composers
Czech male classical composers
Czech opera composers
Male opera composers
Czech classical violists
Academic staff of the Prague Conservatory
19th-century classical composers
20th-century classical composers
Czech conductors (music)
Male conductors (music)
Suicides by jumping in Croatia
Suicides in Yugoslavia
20th-century conductors (music)
20th-century Czech male musicians
19th-century Czech male musicians
1930 deaths
20th-century violists
Violists
Austro-Hungarian musicians